This is a list of archives in Peru.

Archives in Peru 

 Archivo General de la Nación del Perú
 Archivo General del Congreso de la Republica
 Archivo Peruano de Imagen y Sonido
 Archivo Regional de Amazonas
 Archivo Regional de Ancash
 Archivo Regional de Apurímac
 Archivo Regional de Arequipa
 Archivo Regional de Ayacucho
 Archivo Regional de Cajamarca
 Archivo Regional de Callao
 Archivo Regional de Cusco
 Archivo Regional de Huancavelica
 Archivo Regional de Huánuco
 Archivo Regional de Ica
 Archivo Regional de Junín
 Archivo Regional de Lambayeque
 Archivo Regional de La Libertad
 Archivo Regional de Lima
 Archivo Regional de Loreto
 Archivo Regional de Madre de Dios
 Archivo Regional de Moquegua
 Archivo Regional de Pasco
 Archivo Regional de Piura
 Archivo Regional de Puno
 Archivo Regional de San Martín
 Archivo Regional de Tacna
 Archivo Subregional Bajo Mayo - Tarapoto
 Archivo de la Municipalidad de Lima
 Archivo Histórico de la Municipalidad de Piura

See also 
 List of archives
 List of libraries in Peru
 List of museums in Peru
 Culture of Peru
 Portal de Archivos Españoles (federated search of archives in Spain)

External links 
 Regional Archives Directory
 General Archives (all)

 
Archives
Peru
Archives